Carlos Mejia (born 8 November 1957) is a Colombian boxer. He competed in the men's welterweight event at the 1976 Summer Olympics.

References

External links
 

1957 births
Living people
Colombian male boxers
Olympic boxers of Colombia
Boxers at the 1976 Summer Olympics
Place of birth missing (living people)
Welterweight boxers